Eurojet Romania SRL was an independent business charter company headquartered in Bucharest, Romania.

History
Eurojet Romania was established in 2004 when The Rompetrol Group - now known as KMG International - decided to create its own aviation division. Eurojet Romania became at the beginning of 2009 an independent business charter company. The company slogan was Wings for your dreams come true.

Fleet
The Eurojet Romania fleet consisted of the following aircraft:

1 Bombardier Challenger 604
1 Cessna Citation Excel

External links

References

Defunct airlines of Romania
Airlines established in 2004
Airlines disestablished in 2015
Romanian companies established in 2004
2015 disestablishments in Romania